Urim is a Torricelli language of Papua New Guinea. It is also known as Kalp; dialects are Kukwo, Yangkolen. There is a grammatical description by Hemmilä and Luoma (2009).

Phonology
Urim has vowel length contrast, but only for monosyllabic words. Urim also has the prestopped nasals /pm/, /tn/, and /kŋ/.

Urim minimal pairs with short and long vowels:
 ‘time’,  ‘tree trunk’
 ‘wild sago’,  ‘outside’

Pre-stopped nasals contrast with non-pre-stopped nasals:
 ‘species of plant’, waŋ ‘time’,  ‘fire’
 ‘enough’, yan ‘father’,  ‘walk’
 ‘nose’,  ‘you (pl)’
 ‘wasp’,  ‘earthquake’,  ‘liver’

Pronouns
Pronouns are:

{| 
!  !! singular !! dual !! paucal !! plural
|-
! 1incl
|  ||  ||  || mentepm
|-
! 1excl
| kupm || mentakŋ || minto || men
|-
! 2
| kitn || kipmekŋ || kipmteŋ || kipm
|-
! 3
| kil || tuwekŋ || tuteŋ || tu
|}

Like the Lower Sepik-Ramu languages, Urim (as well as Kombio) distinguishes dual and paucal pronouns.

References

Urim languages
Languages of Sandaun Province
Languages of East Sepik Province